Jack Drake is a fictional character from DC Comics books, specifically the Batman titles. Jack is the father of Tim Drake, formerly the third Robin.

Fictional character biography

Initial history and family
A well-respected businessman and archeologist, Jack Drake could never stay down in one place for long lengths of time. He did stick around Gotham City long enough to meet a young woman named Janet, who would later become his wife. The couple became a strong team in business, expanding their company far and wide.

As time passed, Janet gave birth to the Drake's first and only son, Timothy. Although the Drakes loved their son, business always seemed to take a higher priority; Tim was often left behind in a series of Gotham boarding schools while they traveled the world.

When Tim was still a young child, his parents took him to Haly's Circus. Worried that her son might be afraid, Janet was somewhat reluctant to attend, until Jack suggested that they have their picture taken with some performers. At that point, the headliners of the circus, the Flying Graysons, were passing by, and happily agreed to the photo. The youngest performer, Dick Grayson, who would later become the first Robin and later Nightwing, held young Tim in his arms and dedicated his performance to the small boy.

Moments later, tragedy struck when the elder two members of the Flying Graysons were killed before the eyes of their son Dick, and an entire audience, including Bruce Wayne and the Drake Family. The Drakes immediately rushed their son out of the tent, but not before young Tim caught sight of Batman offering Dick Grayson comfort. The Drakes, feeling sorry for Dick, would later mail the boy a copy of the picture that they had taken after learning that he becomes Bruce Wayne's legal ward.

Poisoned
Tim had discovered the identities of Batman and Robin when he was nine years old, after seeing Robin perform a trick only Dick Grayson could perform, on TV.

As the Drakes continued their travels around the world, Tim continued to follow the lives and careers of Batman and Robin. As such Tim was aware of Dick Grayson becoming Nightwing and Jason Todd becoming the second Robin. When Jason Todd was later murdered, Tim grew concerned that Batman was slowly getting out of control due to the absence of Robin. And so Tim would later approach Dick and Bruce, in the hopes of becoming the new Robin.

The Drakes' marriage began to sour at this point. During a trip over Haiti, the couple was captured by a psychotic holy man called the Obeah Man. The couple was held hostage for money, until the Batman came to save them. While Batman had arrested the Obeah Man, however, Jack and Janet were poisoned when they drank some of his voodoo man's water. Janet died instantly, while Jack was left in a coma.

Batman brought Jack back to Gotham and cared for Tim. Some months after their return, Jack came out of his coma, but was left a paraplegic. This new handicap and the loss of his wife led Jack to desire to reconnect with Tim, who by now had become Robin. Tim's duties as the Boy Wonder and his close relationship with Bruce Wayne caused a greater rift with his father, although they did attempt to reconcile.

Second marriage
In time, Jack regained the use of his legs with the aid of physical therapist Dana Winters. Although Dana was considerably younger than Jack, the two immediately felt an attraction for one another and began dating. Dana's involvement in the Drakes' lives was a blessing, as she was able to curb Jack's anger at his son being so distant and help Tim feel more connected to his father. In time, the pair married.

Soon afterward, however, Jack's company went bankrupt, and the family lost their mansion home. Jack fell into a deep depression, during which he began thinking more and more about his late wife, Janet. Jack eventually recovered with the aid of what is believed to be a fabled Valkyrie who came to him, urging him to move on.

Upon learning that Tim had lied to him about trying out for the school's football team, Jack began searching his son's room, until at last he found Tim's secret storage closet of Robin gear. Furious and hurt, Jack confronted Bruce Wayne with a gun. Although Bruce took the gun away, the damage was done; Jack knew the secret identities of Batman, Robin and Nightwing.

Not wishing to cause his father any more pain, Tim agreed that in exchange for his father's silence, he would give up the Robin mantle. This solution was short lived, however; when a massive gang war erupted in Gotham, and spilled over into Tim's school, where one of his classmates was the target of a rival mob family. Tim felt he had no alternative and returned to his life as the Boy Wonder. Although Jack disapproved, he realized that his son was too important to Gotham as Robin, and reluctantly allowed the boy to continue with his duties.

Death and aftermath
Jack died during the Identity Crisis storyline. Hired by the killer of Sue Dibny, Captain Boomerang breaks into the Drake family household in order to kill him. Jack, meanwhile, had been sent a gun by the same killer, in the hopes that Jack would kill Boomerang and place him as the supposed murderer of Sue. Jack shot Boomerang, who had stabbed him in the heart with one of his boomerangs. Following his father's death, Tim mourns painfully and becomes more dark and brooding. Dana, also grief-stricken, is taken to a clinic in Blüdhaven for psychological treatment. She has not been seen or heard from since the destruction of that city. Following the One Year Later event, Bruce Wayne adopts Tim.

Blackest Night
During the Blackest Night event, Jack and Janet Drake are among the deceased raised from their graves by black power rings and recruited to the Black Lantern Corps. Dick Grayson (now the new Batman) warns Tim (known as Red Robin) and tells him to return to Gotham. After Tim's arrival, Jack and Janet are joined by John and Mary Grayson (the parents of Dick), who were also reanimated as Black Lanterns. The foursome then begin their attack on the city, including their respective children, Damian Wayne (the new Robin), Commissioner James Gordon, and Oracle. The Black Lantern Graysons, the Drakes, and also some of the original Dark Knight's reanimated rogues gallery, retreat after Dick and Tim cryogenically suspended themselves as the undead army are unable to read any sign of life from them in their frozen states. Deadman later revives the former Boy Wonders after they left.

The New 52
In 2011, The New 52 rebooted the DC universe. Tim's parents are alive, as they were both in the Witness Protection Program, and asked Batman to look after Tim. It's also revealed that Drake is not their real name.

DC Rebirth
In "DC Rebirth", the Drake family's history has again changed and is closer to the original.

Other versions
A version of Jack Drake made a cameo in Batman: Earth One Volume Two. He works as one of Oswald Cobblepot's lieutenants, but is killed by the Riddler.

In other media
In The New Batman Adventures episode "Sins of the Father", there is a version of Jack Drake named Steven "Shifty" Drake, a small-time criminal who is partially based on Jason Todd's father Willis (much like how Tim is partially based on Jason) who began his criminal career as a teen, and eventually began working as a thug and one of Two-Face's henchmen. In the animated series The New Batman Adventures and the comic book tie-in The Batman Adventures: The Lost Years, Drake is shown admonishing his son for being a fan of and trying to imitate Batman and Robin and steals a chemical weapon Two-Face had planned to use to hold Gotham for ransom, unable to stomach the idea of killing millions of people. He leaves a note to his young son Tim with a key, saying: "Sorry, Timmy, the heat's on. I got to leave a while. Hang on to these for me. Dad". He then kisses his son goodbye, knowing deep down that he will never see him again. His body is eventually found in Metropolis near Hobs Bay, leaving Tim as an orphan under the custody of Bruce Wayne. After learning that his father was trying to stop Two-Face, Tim becomes the new Robin in order to help Batman foil the villain's plan, and to honor his father's dying wish.

Jack and Janet Drake appear in season 3 of Titans portrayed by Ryan Allen and Chantria Tram. Jack is depicted as an African-American man and Janet is depicted as a Cantonese woman where they run an Asian restaurant in Gotham City.

References

Batman characters
Fictional businesspeople
Fictional archaeologists
Comics characters introduced in 1990
Characters created by Marv Wolfman
Fictional characters with paraplegia